The North Pacific frostfish, Benthodesmus pacificus, is a cutlassfish of the family Trichiuridae found in the north Pacific Ocean between latitudes 50° N and 30° N at depths of .

References

 
 Tony Ayling & Geoffrey Cox, Collins Guide to the Sea Fishes of New Zealand,  (William Collins Publishers Ltd, Auckland, New Zealand 1982) 

Trichiuridae
Fish described in 1970